Helen McCourt (29 July 1965 – c. 9 February 1988) was a 22-year-old British insurance clerk from Lancashire (now Merseyside), England, who disappeared on 9 February 1988 in the village of Billinge, Metropolitan Borough of St Helens, Merseyside, shortly after getting off a bus less than five hundred yards from her home. Her body has never been found. Ian Simms, a local pub landlord, was charged with and convicted of her murder.

The case is a rare example where a murder conviction has been obtained without the presence of a body, and was one of the first in the UK to use DNA fingerprinting. In 2015, Helen McCourt's mother, Marie, began a campaign to change the law regarding the conviction of killers such as Simms, requiring them to reveal the whereabouts of their victim's remains before being considered for parole. The campaign led to the announcement of plans to introduce a "Helen's Law" in May 2019. On 5 July 2019, David Gauke, then Secretary of State for Justice, confirmed the law would be adopted in England and Wales. A Parole Board hearing on 8 November recommended Simms for release, the decision coming before the legislation could be introduced. The McCourt family launched a bid to keep Simms in jail but it was rejected by the High Court in February 2020, and Simms was subsequently released on licence. He died on 24 June 2022 without revealing the location of Helen's body.

Background and disappearance
Helen McCourt spoke with her mother Marie by telephone before 4:00 pm on 9 February 1988, shortly before she was due to leave work. She was planning to go out for the evening with her new boyfriend and wanted her tea ready earlier so she had time to wash her hair.

Two days before her disappearance, Helen had been involved in a heated argument with a woman in a pub called the George and Dragon (now the Billinge Arms). The landlord was Ian Simms, who was aged 31 at the time and married with two small children. After the argument, Simms had banned Helen from the pub and, according to several customers, had used obscene language about her and said how much he "hated" her. He had made repeated sexual advances to Helen which she had rejected, and also believed Helen knew about his affair with his 21-year-old mistress - who he had moved into the pub flat behind his wife's back - and was gossiping about it.

Helen alighted from her bus around 5:15 pm and set off on the short journey home, a route that took her past the pub. Within minutes, a man getting off another bus heard a loud scream coming from the pub that was cut short. Helen has never been seen or heard from since that night.

Evidence
While being questioned by police, Simms came under suspicion when he became extremely nervous. His car was impounded, and forensic scientists found traces of Helen's blood: spots of blood on the rubber sill of the boot and a bloodstain on the boot carpet. In the boot they also found an opal and pearl earring, later identified by Marie as one of a pair Helen had been given for her 21st birthday; she had been wearing the earrings on the day she vanished. The butterfly clip from this earring was found by a fingertip search in a bedroom of Simms' flat. Traces of her blood were also found in Simms' flat: on the carpet at the foot of the stairs leading to his apartment, on a bedroom carpet in his flat, on wallpaper in the bedroom, and splashed on wallpaper next to the outside door to Simms' accommodation, where police believe she was first attacked. Police believe she was struck at least twice in the face.

In March, Helen's handbag, taupe coat, maroon scarf, navy trousers, white knickers and green mittens were found on a riverbank in Irlam, about twenty miles away, in a black binliner proved to have been taken from a roll of them in Simms' pub. Also found with the clothes was a cotton jacket which Simms admitted was his. There were bloodstains on both sleeves and hair from her head and a fibre from her mittens was found in a pocket. The presence of Helen's trousers and underwear in the bin liner indicates the strong possibility that Simms sexually assaulted her before killing her. It may alternatively indicate that Helen could have been dismembered as all her clothing was taken away from her, making it easier for dismemberment.

Fibres from the stair carpet, landing carpet and back bedroom carpet of Simms flat were found on Helen’s coat and new trousers (worn for the first time that morning) indicating she was dragged upstairs after being attacked by him. A witness working in the pub's restaurant testified she heard dragging noises from above her during the time of the murder. Also found with her clothing was a length of electrical flex. This was similar to other lengths of flex found in Simms' flat, which he used in playing with his two dogs. The flex found at Irlam had dog toothmarks on it that were matched to Simms' dogs; it also had strands of human hair caught in a knot that were matched to hairs from Helen's hair rollers. It is thought this flex was used to strangle her.

A man also came forward to say that, on the morning after Helen's disappearance, he had discovered a blood-stained towel while walking his dog along the Manchester Ship Canal in Hollins Green, Warrington. He later discovered a second towel along with several items of men's clothing, which also had blood on them; the blood was later identified as coming from Helen. The jumper had the logo for Labatt, a brand of beer popular at the George and Dragon pub. When asked about the clothes, Simms at first categorically denied they were his. After his wife and mistress both confirmed they were, he changed his story.

Trial
At his trial in 1989, Simms denied murdering Helen, claiming that someone must have got into his flat, stolen his clothes and dressed in them, and attacked and murdered her without his knowledge. This person had then used his car to dispose of her body and then left his clothes where they would be found to incriminate him. Simms admitted that he was in the pub from 4:20 to 6 o'clock. He could not explain how this other person could have got into the pub, dressed in his clothes and attacked and murdered Helen during this time without disturbing either him or his Rotweiler guard dog. The jury did not believe him and convicted him of the murder. Simms was one of the first persons to be convicted on DNA evidence without the victim's body having been discovered. 

In the absence of Helen's body, forensic scientists used a new technique, using blood samples from her parents to compare with the blood found in Simms' apartment, on his clothes and in the boot of his car. The odds were 126,000 to one against the blood not being from a child of Helen's parents. In 1999, Simms challenged the findings based on the DNA evidence that linked him to the crime; improved DNA technology then suggested the odds against the blood not being Helen's were nine million to one. Investigative journalist Bob Woffinden campaigned for Simms, claiming he was innocent. After Woffinden was initially banned from visiting Simms in jail in order to publicise his story – something which was welcomed by Helen's parents – the law on this was changed so as to allow inmates' stories to be told in the media by journalists (which remains the law today).

Simms was given a life sentence with a minimum tariff of sixteen years. He continued to maintain his innocence.

Aftermath
Since her daughter's disappearance, Marie McCourt has devoted herself to work for Support after Murder and Manslaughter (SAMM), and continued to pressure Simms to reveal the location of Helen's body. She lobbied the department of the Lord Chancellor to have him charged with preventing a burial. She continued to search for her daughter's body herself.

In July 2008, a marble bench was placed on the grounds of St Mary's Roman Catholic Church, Billinge to mark what would have been Helen McCourt's 43rd birthday and to honour her memory. In February 2013, a memorial Mass for Helen McCourt was held on the 25th anniversary of her disappearance.

On 16 October 2013, police exhumed a grave behind St Aidan's Anglican Church, Billinge after receiving a tip-off that Helen's body had been placed inside an open grave ahead of a burial at the church in February 1988. The exhumation showed that Helen's body had not been placed there.

Simms never disclosed the whereabouts of Helen's body. In December 2015, her mother launched a campaign calling for a change in the law that would prevent convicted murderers who refuse to reveal the location of bodies of victims from being released on parole. Simms was allowed out of prison on temporary release in March 2019. 

In May 2019, the UK's Ministry of Justice announced plans to change the law regarding parole to place "greater consideration on failure to disclose the location of a victim's remains". In such cases as that of the murder of Helen McCourt, where a conviction is secured without the presence of a body, "Helen's Law" would require a person convicted of murder to reveal the location of their victim's remains before being considered for parole. On 5 July 2019, then Secretary of State for Justice David Gauke confirmed the law would be adopted in England and Wales.

On 21 November 2019, before the law could be adopted, it was reported that a Parole Board review on 8 November had recommended Simms for release, finding that he had "met the terms for release". The bill to introduce Helen's Law had been in the process of being debated by parliament when parliament was dissolved ahead of the 2019 general election. On discovering that her daughter's killer would be released, Marie McCourt urged the next government to introduce "Helen's Law". In February 2020, the McCourt family's bid to keep Simms in jail was refused by the High Court, and Simms was released on licence.

Simms died on 24 June 2022, without having revealed the location of Helen McCourt's body.

"Helen's Law" has been criticised by victims' families, advocates, and others as "a law without teeth".

See also

John Cannan – British man suspected to have murdered the missing Suzy Lamplugh
James Hanratty – a murderer for whom Bob Woffinden also campaigned to be cleared and was later proven to be guilty
Murder of Alison Shaughnessy – a case in which Woffinden successfully campaigned for the convicted murderer to be freed. There remain no other suspects.
Murder of Billie-Jo Jenkins – another case in which Woffinden campaigned for the convicted murderer to be freed
List of major crimes in the United Kingdom
List of murder convictions without a body
List of solved missing person cases

References

1980s missing person cases
1988 murders in the United Kingdom
1988 in England
Deaths by person in England
Female murder victims
Missing person cases in England
Murder convictions without a body
Violence against women in England
Billinge, Merseyside